Huduga Hudugi is a 2010 Kannada-language comedy film written and directed by Indrajit Lankesh. The film features Dhyan and Lekha Washington in the lead roles, whilst other noted actresses play roles in the film. The film was launched in 2008 as Thunta Thunti with Ganesh and Praneetha in the lead roles and then a second launch was conducted in March 2010 with Ganesh and Ishita Sharma but the pair later opted out of the project.

Plot 

Sachin (Dhyan) a popular TV anchor co-hosts a hugely popular show with Sonia (Lekha Washington). Both of them are carrying their own baggage. While Sachin has had a stint with heartbreak, Sonia's disappointment stems from refusal by a rich guy to marry her.
Sachin tries to bring some happiness to her life and in the process they get closer. Sonia comes to term with the fact that Sachin is the best guy for her. But will she be able to get Sachin?

Cast 

Dhyan as Sachin
Lekha Washington as Sonia
Sadha as Maya
Sanjjanaa Galrani
Anita Hassanandani
Jadi Akash
Pramod Hegde as Raj Deshpande
Rangayana Raghu
Sharan
Suchendra Prasad as a television anchor
Ileana D'Cruz in an item number.
Bianca Desai in an item number.
Indrajit Lankesh in an item number.

Soundtrack 
The music was composed by Joshua Sridhar and released by Anand Audio Video.

Reception

Critical response 

A critic from The Times of India scored the film at 4 out of 5 and wrote "Dhyan does a commendable job as a TV anchor, and Lekha Washington has matched up to his performance. Joshwa Sridhar's foot-tapping music is sure to attract youngistan. Dialogues by B A Madhu are clever". Shruti Indira Lakshminarayana of Rediff.com scored the film at 1.5 out of 5 stars and says "The film takes a dig at several popular tv programmes and hosts, but at the same time leaves enough scope for the media to pick out its flaws. The 'ugly truth' about Huduga Hudugi is that it is a collage of several mushy movies. There is nothing new even for the die-hard romantics". A critic from The New Indian Express wrote "Sharan’s comedy is not up to the mark. It is not clear what made the director select Rangaayana Raghu to imitate late Shankar Nag. The director has not even spared journalists and TV channels including the CEO of a particular channel. Perhaps, his intention was to make the audience giggle. The USP of this film is glamorous heroines and eyepleasing cinematography. Finally, Indrajit has proved that he too can act in films by shaking his leg along with lanky Russian beauties".

References 

2010 films
2010s Kannada-language films
Films scored by Joshua Sridhar
Films directed by Indrajit Lankesh